The Night Poaching Act 1828 is an Act of the Parliament of the United Kingdom (citation 9 Geo. IV c. 69)  still in effect in the 21st century. It forbids night poaching, especially ''taking or destroying game on lands, etc., by night, or entering lands at night to take or destroy game.
For the purposes of this Act the word “game” shall be deemed to include hares, pheasants, partridges, grouse, heath or moor game, black game, and bustards.

The Act — in particular, its original provisions for transportation to colonies such as Tasmania — made headlines in 2007, when two rabbit poachers were convicted and fined under it before magistrates at Hereford.

See also
Game Act 1831

Notes

External links

Text of the Act as originally enacted The Statutes At Large, 1828 (from Google Books)

United Kingdom Acts of Parliament 1828
Hunting and shooting in the United Kingdom
Hunting legislation